The season 1968–69 of the Tercera División (3rd Level) of the Spanish football started on August 1968 and ended on May–June 1969 the regular phase.

League table

Group I

Group II

Group III

Group IV

Group V

Group VI

Group VII

Group VIII

Promotion to Segunda

Promoted to Segunda: C.D. Orense, C.At. Osasuna, C.D. Castellón & U.D. Salamanca 
Promotion-Relegation playoff: Bilbao At. Club, C.D. San Andrés, Hércules C.F. & R.C. Recreativo de Huelva

Promotion-Relegation playoff

Continuing in Segunda: C.D. Ilicitano & Onteniente C.F. 
Promoted to Segunda: Bilbao At. Club & C.D. San Andrés 
Relegated to Tercera: C. Dep. Alavés & C.D. Alcoyano

External links
RSSSF 
Futbolme 

Tercera División seasons
3
Spain